Ismael Koné (born 5 June 1974) is a Swedish boxer. He competed in the men's light heavyweight event at the 1996 Summer Olympics.

References

External links
 

1974 births
Living people
Swedish male boxers
Olympic boxers of Sweden
Boxers at the 1996 Summer Olympics
Sportspeople from Malmö
Light-heavyweight boxers
20th-century Swedish people